Ranarangam is a 2019 Indian Telugu-language action crime film written and directed by Sudheer Varma. Produced by Suryadevara Naga Vamsi under his banner Sithara Entertainments, it features Sharwanand, Kajal Aggarwal and Kalyani Priyadarshan in the lead roles. The film follows a non-linear narrative and chronicles the rise of a gangster and powerful liquor-baron named Deva. 

Ranarangam was released on 15 August 2019 to mixed reviews from the critics and audience. Despite a strong opening, the film becomes a  commercial failure at the box office.

Plot
In Spain, Sanjay is a contractor, who takes the help of an MLA from Visakhapatnam to convince a liquor baron named Deva to clear a slum area which can be used for the construction of the Vizag International Airport, so that the value of the neighboring land, which is meant for the construction and belonging to Sanjay, will increase. However, Deva refuses the request. 

1990: In Visakhapatnam, Deva and his friends sell illegal black tickets for films. During that time, Deva falls in love with Gita. When the prohibition of alcohol is announced in 1997, Deva decides to enter the illegal liquor business by smuggling alcohol from Orissa into the city and selling it. In this process, Deva and his gang subsequently lock horns with another illegal liquor baron and MLA Simhachalam. 

Deva and his gang are imprisoned for 6 months after being caught smuggling a truckload of liquor into the state. When they are released, they attack and steal a consignment of liquor belonging to Simhachalam. A slow shift in power takes place, as Deva bribes higher officials who were on Simhachalam’s payroll. In retribution, Simhachalam murders Deva’s friends and orchestrates a bomb blast that kills his wife Gita, hours after she had given birth to Sahasra. A vengeful Deva goes on a killing spree, finishing Simhachalam’s associates and shutting down his criminal empire, as Simhachalam himself goes into hiding.

Present: Deva and his daughter Sahasra, become well acquainted with Geetha, a doctor. During an outing to a mall with Sahasra and Geetha, an assassination attempt is made on Deva by Sanjay, who has colluded with Deva’s rivals in Spain and is being assisted by Simhachalam. Geetha and Sahasra are kidnapped by Simhachalam in Deva’s absence. Deva agrees and flies to Visakhapatnam to meet Simhachalam. 

In a turn of events, Deva reveals that he had secretly found and murdered Simhachalam 10 days after the latter had gone into hiding, and is aware that the man pretending to be Simhachalam and orchestrating the scam is Deva’s right-hand man Suri. Suri reveals that his thirst for power and jealousy that Deva rose above them all despite the business being all of theirs led to his betrayal. Suri’s men attack him instead of Deva, revealing that they are working for the latter. Deva kills Suri, Sanjay and the Home Minister, where he moves back to Spain.

Cast

Sharwanand as Deva 
Kajal Aggarwal as Geetha
Kalyani Priyadarshan as Gita
Preethi Alluri as Sahasra (Gita and Deva's daughter)
Murali Sharma as MLA Simhachalam
Raja Chembolu as Suri
Brahmaji as Home Minister
Praveen as Vinay (Deva's Assistant in Spain) 
Ajay as Sanjay
Aadarsh Balakrishna as Seshu
Bhadram as Gita’s prospective groom
Pankaj Kesari as Pankaj
Sudarshan as Deva's gang member
 Raja Ravindra as CI Sriram

Release
The film was released theatrically on 15 August 2019. The film was later dubbed and released in Hindi as Don Returns on 4 April 2021 by Goldmines Telefilms directly on their own TV channel Dhinchaak.

Soundtrack

Prashant Pillai, Karthik Rodriguez and Sunny M.R. composed the soundtrack of the film, where the former composed the background score. All lyrics were penned by Krishna Chaitanya, except the song "Seetha Kalyanam" which was penned by Balaji. Aditya Music hold the rights to the music. The first single, "Seetha Kalyanam" sung by Srihari and written by Balaji was released on 4 July 2019. The second song "Kannu Kotti" both composed and sung by Karthik Rodriguez was released on 20 July 2019. The third single "Pilla Picture Perfect" composed by Sunny M.R. was released on 29 July 2019. The entire soundtrack album was released on 10 August 2019.

Reception 
The Times of India gave 3 out of 5 stars stating "The kind of film that allows you to soak in its mindless beauty much before you realise it’s heading in a completely predictable direction".

References

External links 

2019 films
2010s Telugu-language films
2019 crime action films
Indian crime action films
Films about organised crime in India
Indian gangster films
Films directed by Sudheer Varma